Good Enough to Eat (French: Une fille à croquer) is a 1951 French comedy film directed by Raoul André and starring Gaby Morlay, Louise Carletti and Serge Reggiani. It draws inspiration from the story of Red Riding Hood.

The film's sets were designed by the art director Maurice Colasson. It was partly shot on location around Yvelines.

Main cast
 Gaby Morlay as Madame de Mergrand / Mathilde Chaperon 
 Louise Carletti as Rose Chaperon 
 Serge Reggiani as Jean-Louis dit Loup 
 Francis Blanche as Gilles 
 Pierre Dac as Pantois 
 Jérôme Goulven as Le brigadier / Charles Perrault 
 Charles Dechamps as Hughes 
 Paul Demange as Le patron de l'auberge de l'Hermitière 
 Roger Legris as Félix 
 Jacques Hilling as Pou - le frère de Madame de Mergrand 
 Adrienne Gallon as Céline 
 Louis Blanche as Maître Ruban 
 Edith Fontaine as Annette 
 Maurice Schutz as Grand-père Luc

References

Bibliography 
 Jack Zipes. The Enchanted Screen: The Unknown History of Fairy-Tale Films. Routledge, 2011.

External links 
 

1951 films
1951 comedy films
French comedy films
1950s French-language films
Films directed by Raoul André
French black-and-white films
1950s French films